Julian Antonisz (November 8, 1941 – January 31, 1987), born Julian Józef Antoniszczak, was a Polish avant-garde filmmaker, artist, film animator, screenwriter, composer, and inventor.

Julian Antoniszczak graduated from the Faculty of Painting and Graphic Art of the Krakow Academy of Fine Arts in 1965. Two years later he debuted with his first animated film Phobia (Fobia in Polish). Antonisz became known as a Polish promoter of a unique animation technique called direct animation produced by creating images directly on film stock i.e. "non-camera". Antoniszczak's Sun: A Non-Camera Film 1977 (Słońce - film bez kamery) was his first all non-camera movie, although the technique has been used also in Antonisz's earlier productions. The idea after the technique was to paint or scratch the images directly onto the movie tape instead of using a camcorder. Usually one second of movie uses 24 frames. For example, his debut film Phobia 1967, lasts 11 minutes. 660 seconds times 24 frames gives us 15,840 images that had to be painted.

Antonisz famous of his mechanical skills, has constructed numerous accessories supporting the creation of non-camera movies. His own "Antoniszograf fazujący" was a machine which scratched a set of frames, with a fluid frame by frame transition between the following images. Another invention was his prototype of a "chropograf" (which could loosely be translated as texture-graph), which created an image with distinctive levels of roughness, allowing the blind to recognize shapes presented on the picture.

His most awarded work was How the Miniature Dachshund Works, 1971 (Jak działa jamniczek).

Filmography

References

External links 
 
Julian Józef Antoniszczak (Antonisz) at culture.pl

Polish experimental filmmakers
Polish film directors
Polish animated film directors
Polish animators
Polish inventors
Polish composers
1941 births
1987 deaths
Drawn-on-film animators